Ot Guru Kol Lako bodra (19 September 1919 – 29 June 1986) (in Ho: jonom chanduh aangai-aten chanduh atowari ) is the creator of the Warang Chiti writing system used for writing the Ho language.

Early life

Ott Guru Kol Lako Bodra was born on 19 September 1919 in Paseya village, Khutpani Block, West Singhbhum, Jharkhand to a humble and religious family of Lebeya and Jano Kui Bodra. He started his primary education at Badchom Hatu primary school. After completing his primary school he took admission in Purueya primary school. In Purueya he completed his 8th class then his parents sent him to his maternal uncle's home in Chakradharpur. In Chakradharpur, he was admitted to the Grammar High School in 9th class. After completing his 9th class he went to Chaibasa for further studies. He took admission in matriculation in District High School, Chaibasa. After completing matriculation there, he moved to Jalandhar, Punjab with the help of Jaipal Singh for further education and attended Jalandhar city college where he graduated in Homeopathy.

Professional life and Warang Chiti

After completing his education he went back home. Then he got a job in Indian Railways as a clerk and was posted to Danguwapasi. During his job in railways he invented the Warang Chiti alphabet. For spreading it, he created Adi Samaj (Dupub Huda) in Jodapokhar, Jhinkpani by help of Mr. Mahati Bandara. Adi Samaj meetings were held in a house in the ACC cement plant colony in Jhinkpani. Near by village people came to the Adi Samaj to become literate in Warang Chiti.

References

Official Website

Munda people
1919 births
1986 deaths
Adivasi writers
Writers from Jharkhand
Creators of writing systems
20th-century Indian poets
20th-century Indian educational theorists
20th-century Indian dramatists and playwrights